Moving Target  is a 2000 Irish/American exploitation action film directed by Paul Ziller starring Don "The Dragon" Wilson.

It stars Don "The Dragon" Wilson and was the last film Roger Corman made at Concorde Anois.

Plot
A breakaway extremist group of IRA steals nuclear detonators hidden inside six glass bottles of Beamish. Meanwhile, an innocent tourist named Ray Brock (played by Don Wilson) arrives in Headford, Co. Galway to visit Alice, a woman whom he has been conversing with online. In order to win favour with Alice, Ray goes to a local pub to purchase a six-pack of Beamish. He accidentally purchases the same six-pack that the nuclear detonators are hidden in, and becomes embroiled in a cat-and-mouse chase between the IRA extremists, US intelligence and the Garda Síochána.

Cast 

 Don "The Dragon" Wilson as Ray Brock
 Bill Murphy as Mickey
 Eileen McCloskey as Alice Doyle
 Terry McMahon as Malloy
 Nuala Kelly as Lt. Brady
 Mick Nolan as Det. Stokes
 Stephen Holland as John
 Eamonn Draper as Mike
 Lisa Dwan as Kate
 Hillary Kavanagh as Shannon 
 Sean Colgan as Parnell
 Luke Hayden as Sean

References

External links
Moving Target at IMDb
Moving Target at BFI

2000 films
American action films
Films directed by Paul Ziller
2000s English-language films
2000s American films